Warren Alwyn Simpson (28 March 1922 – 28 June 1980) was an Australian professional snooker player.

Career
After winning several amateur championships at state and national level, Simpson turned professional in the early 1960s. He reached the final of the 1971 World Snooker Championship, losing 37–29 to John Spencer which was played in Sydney, Australia in November 1970.

Simpson competed in three further World Championships between 1973 and 1975. In 1974, despite suffering from influenza, he discharged himself from hospital to play in his match against Bernard Bennett, but went on to lose 8–2.

He suffered from diabetes for many years and died in 1980, aged 58. He was married and had a son.

Career titles
 New South Wales Snooker Championship: 1952, 1953, 1955, 1956, 1957
 Australia National Snooker Championship: 1953, 1954, 1957
 Australian Professional Championship: 1963, 1968, 1969

References

Australian snooker players
1980 deaths
1922 births
Sportsmen from New South Wales